Douglas or Doug Bennett may refer to:

 Douglas Bennett (canoeist) (1918–2008), Canadian flatwater canoeist
 Douglas Bennett (cricketer, born 1886) (1886–1982), South African cricketer
 Douglas Bennett (cricketer, born 1912) (1912–1984), South African cricketer
 Douglas C. Bennett (born 1946), American academic
 Douglas J. Bennet (1938–2018), president of Wesleyan University, Middletown, Connecticut, United States
 Doug Bennett (footballer) (1894–1975), Australian footballer
 Doug Bennett (Michigan politician) (born 1945), American politician in the Michigan House of Representatives
 Doug Bennett (musician) (1951–2004), Canadian musician